Lara Marie Lessmann (born 10 February 2000) is a German Freestyle BMX rider based in Berlin. 

Originally from Flensburg in the north German state of Schleswig-Holstein, she moved to the German capital because of the better training conditions in Berlin's Mellowpark. 

She finished second at the 2017 UCI Freestyle BMX World Championships and won the gold medal at the 2018 Youth Olympic Games in Argentina in the mixed team event with Evan Brandes.
She also won rounds in Croatia and China at the UCI World Cup Series.

References 

Living people
2000 births
BMX riders
German female cyclists
Sportspeople from Berlin
Cyclists at the 2018 Summer Youth Olympics
Youth Olympic gold medalists for Germany
Cyclists at the 2020 Summer Olympics
Olympic cyclists of Germany
21st-century German women